Eubaphe helveta is a species of moth in the family Geometridae first described by William Barnes in 1907. It is found in North America.

The MONA or Hodges number for Eubaphe helveta is 7442.

References

Further reading

 
 

Eudulini
Articles created by Qbugbot
Moths described in 1907